Radice is a surname of Italian origin which may refer to:

Anne-Imelda Radice, American art museum director and arts administrator
Attilia Radice (1914–1980), Italian ballerina
Barbara Radice (born 1943), Italian design critic, writer, and editor
Betty Radice (1912–1985), British literary editor and translator
Casimiro Radice (1834–1908), Italian painter
Frank Radice (born 1949), American television industry executive, businessman and author
Gabriela Radice (born 1968), Argentine journalist
Gerolamo Radice (1883–1948), Italian professional footballer
Giles Radice, Baron Radice (1936–2022), British politician
Giovanni Lombardo Radice (born 1954), Italian film actor
Julius J. Radice (1908–1966), American physician and athlete
Lucio Lombardo-Radice (1916–1982), Italian mathematician
Luigi Radice (1935–2018), Italian football player and manager
Mario Radice (1898–1987), Italian painter
Mark Radice (born 1957), American singer/musician and producer
Raul Radice (1902–1988), Italian writer
Vittorio Radice (born 1957), Italian businessman and retail manager
William Radice (born 1951), British poet, writer and translator

See also 
Radica (disambiguation)
Radical (disambiguation)
Radici (disambiguation)